The 12th Central Committee of the Communist Party of Vietnam was elected at the 12th National Congress of the Communist Party of Vietnam in January 2016. The 12th Central Committee elected the 12th Politburo and the 12th Secretariat.

Plenums
The Central Committee is not a permanent institution. Instead, it convenes plenary sessions between party congresses. When the CC is not in session, decision-making powers are delegated to the internal bodies of the CC itself; that is, the Politburo and the Secretariat. None of these organs are permanent bodies either; typically, they convene several times a month.

Composition

Members

Alternates

References

External links
Party Central Committee members announced

2016 in Vietnam
12th Central Committee of the Communist Party of Vietnam